Huang Guo-shu (8 August 1905 – 8 December 1987), born Yeh Yen-sheng was the President of the Legislative Yuan, first as acting from 1951 to 1952, then officially from 1961 to 1972. He also served as the Vice President of the Legislative Yuan from 1950 to 1961. Huang was the first President of the Legislative Yuan to be born in Taiwan.

Biography 
Yeh Yen-sheng was born in 1905, in the small town of Hoppo, Shinchiku Prefecture, Taiwan under Japanese rule (today Beipu, Hsinchu). In 1920, he went to mainland China and changed his name to Huang Guo-shu. Later, Huang went to study at the Imperial Japanese Army Academy.

After the Second Sino-Japanese War, Huang returned to Taiwan as a major general. He was very prominent and was able to participate in Legislative Yuan elections. In 1950, Huang was elected Vice-President of the Legislative Yuan. On 24 February 1961, Chang Tao-fan resigned as president, and as a result Huang became president. He held the post for 11 years, when in 1972, he resigned due to health issues.

Huang was also a managing director of a company called Guoguang Life Insurance. The company filed for bankruptcy in 1970, and in 1972 the Ministry of Finance ordered Guoguang Life Insurance to close. Debt was reported to be NT$110 million.

Huang continued to serve as a member of the Legislative Yuan until his death in 1987.

References 

1905 births
1987 deaths
Taiwanese business executives
Politicians of the Republic of China on Taiwan from Hsinchu County
20th-century Taiwanese businesspeople
Presidents of the Legislative Yuan
Members of the 1st Legislative Yuan
Members of the 1st Legislative Yuan in Taiwan
Kuomintang Members of the Legislative Yuan in Taiwan
Imperial Japanese Army Academy alumni
Businesspeople in insurance